Shankar Lal Khatik (born 3 March 1935) is an Indian politician from the Bharatiya Janata Party. He was brother of former MLA late Uttamchand Khatik.

Career
He won the 1989 general election of India from the Sagar Lok Sabha constituency. He was a member of the Indian 9th Lok Sabha (1989–1991).

See also

 List of people from Madhya Pradesh

References

1935 births
India MPs 1989–1991
Living people
Lok Sabha members from Madhya Pradesh
People from Sagar, Madhya Pradesh
Bharatiya Janata Party politicians from Madhya Pradesh